Christopher Maye (born 28 February 1984) is a former professional rugby league footballer who played in the 2000s.

Playing career

Club career
Maye was transferred from the Wigan Warriors to St. Helens.

International honours
Chris Maye won four caps (plus one as substitute) for Ireland in 2003–2004 while at St. Helens, and the Swinton Lions.

Genealogical information
Chris Maye is the nephew of the rugby league footballer; Chris Joynt.

References

External links
Profile at saints.org.uk

1984 births
Halifax R.L.F.C. players
Ireland national rugby league team players
Living people
Oldham R.L.F.C. players
Place of birth missing (living people)
Rugby league centres
Rugby league locks
St Helens R.F.C. players
Swinton Lions players
Wigan Warriors players